Butaho is a town in South Kivu in eastern Democratic Republic of the Congo. It is located near the border with Burundi along National Highway 5.

Populated places in South Kivu